Ismael or Ishmael (ISO 259-3 Yišmaˁel;  Ismaēl; ;  ʼIsmāʻīl), is a village in Sangcharak District at Sar-e Pol Province of Afghanistan.
It is located in the northern part of Afghanistan, near the border of Turkmenistan. It is about 2 hours drive from Mazari Sharif, which is the most prominent town in the area. It also has the closest airport near Ismael.

See also
 Sar-e Pol Province

References

Bibliography 
 Mir Hosseini, Ali Naghi. (2009). Sangcharak in Bed Time, Vol. 1, Qum: Ishraq.

Populated places in Sar-e Pol Province